Kristin Solli Schøien (born July 14, 1954) is a Norwegian author and composer. 

Schøien studied at NLA University College, the University of Oslo, and the Norwegian Academy of Music. She is especially known for her hymnwriting.

Schøien lives in Eidskog and was previously employed as a lecturer at the Norwegian School of Theology. She also became known for the cabaret show Jeg synger min sang for vinden (I Sing My Song to the Wind), which sets to music poetry by Herman Wildenvey. It was first staged in 1990, and later in many places throughout Norway. A CD with the same title was later issued.

Awards
 Brunlanes Municipal Culture Award (1986) (for creating a show based on poetry by Herman Wildenvey set to music)
 Herman Wildenvey Poetry Award (2008)

Bibliography
 Vet du ikke at du er rik (Don't You Know You're Rich; Oslo: Credo Forlag, 1971)
 På min egen måte – 33 sanger og bibelviser (In My Own Way: 33 Songs and Bible Verses; Oslo: Verbum Forlag, 1993)
 Når skoen trykker – om tro og troverdighet (When the Shoe Pinches: Faith and Credibility; Oslo: IM-forlaget, 1993)
 Fra torget til vingården – metode og ressursbok for gudstjenestearbeid (From the Square to the Vineyard: Method and Resource Manual for Liturgy; Oslo: Luther Forlag, 2001)
 Kirkebygget – bruk og vern, studieveiledning for Kirketjenerskolen (The Church Building: Use and Protection, a Study Guide for Sexton Education; Kristiansand: Høyskoleforlaget, 2002)
 En kurv til min datter (A Basket for My Daughter; Oslo: Luther Forlag, 2003)

References

Norwegian composers
Norwegian hymnwriters
Norwegian songwriters
1954 births
Living people
University of Oslo alumni
Norwegian Academy of Music alumni
Women hymnwriters
People from Eidskog